Sunken Silver is a 1925 American film serial directed by Spencer Gordon Bennet and George B. Seitz. The serial is preserved at the UCLA Film and Television Archive.

Plot
As described in a film magazine review, Brice, a secret service agent, seeks information regarding stolen silver which disappeared from the government in 1804. Hade and Milo seek the fortune for themselves, as do the "Conches," natives of Florida since the time the loot was buried. Claire, half-sister of Milo, falls in love with Brice. Brice is captured by Milo and Hade and taken to an island where he is to be killed. He is rescued by another secret service agent. Despite being thrown into a sea full of sharks, he escapes the island. Claire and Brice are captured by Conches, but then escape their camp. After they have returned to Claire's home, Milo advances on Brice just as the Conches attack the house using a secret tunnel. They are repulsed by a steam of boiling water poured into the tunnel. Hade is arrested, but escapes only to meet his death wandering in the Everglades. The government takes possession of the money and Brice takes possession of his new wife, Claire.

Cast

See also
 List of film serials
 List of film serials by studio

References

External links

1925 films
American silent serial films
American black-and-white films
Pathé Exchange film serials
Films directed by Spencer Gordon Bennet
Films directed by George B. Seitz
1920s American films